Osmodes laronia, the large white-spots, is a butterfly in the family Hesperiidae. It is found in Guinea, Sierra Leone, Liberia, Ivory Coast, Ghana, Togo, Nigeria, Cameroon, Gabon, the Central African Republic, the Democratic Republic of the Congo, Uganda and western Kenya. The habitat consists of forests.

Adults of both sexes are attracted to flowers.

The larvae feed on Marantochloa cuspidata, Thalia welwitschii and Thaumatococcus daniellii.

References

Butterflies described in 1868
Erionotini
Butterflies of Africa
Taxa named by William Chapman Hewitson